Yuja-cha or yuja tea is a traditional Korean tea made by mixing hot water with yuja-cheong (yuja marmalade). Yuja tea is popular throughout Korea, especially in the winter. This tea is created by curing yuja into a sweet, thick, pulpy syrup. It does not contain caffeine. It is often sold in markets in large jars and used as a home remedy for the common cold.

Yuja tea is made from the yuja fruit, which is commonly known outside of Korea as yuzu. Yuja does not contain much juice, unlike other citrus fruits. They are able to cook in high temperatures without losing their tartness. Yuja have a strong fragrance. Their scent comes from the zest, juices, and essential oils. Yuja tea is bittersweet. In addition, yuja tea is a preservative, so it can be left out on a shelf or counter.

History 
A man was carrying a shipment of yuja trees from China to Korea until a storm came and hit his boat. The yuja trees were destroyed, but some of the seeds went into the man's coat. As the man continued on Korea's soil, the seeds fell on the ground and grew into yuja trees. Koreans saw the benefits the leaves had and used the yuja leaves for the common cold by crushing it. Because of its bitter taste, they began to preserve the leaves in sugar and honey, which later developed into the yuja tea. King Sejong, who was responsible for the creation of the Korean Hangul script, was its greatest advocate.

Names 
Occasionally, the term yuja-cha can also be used to refer to the jarred yuja marmalade used to make the tea. The drink's name is sometimes translated into "citron tea" or "honey citron tea" in English, but yuja and citron are different citrus fruits. In Sinophone regions, the tea is referred to as "", but the word  in Chinese refers to pomelo, not yuja. The word "" is a result of direct translation from the tea's Korean name.

Benefits 
Yuja tea is well known for its health benefits, albeit medically unproven. It is said to have more vitamin C (2.3 times more) than raw lemon juice. The vitamin C in yuja tea allegedly helps the immune system to fight against infections and other diseases/illnesses.

Preparation 
Yuja tea can be made at home from scratch. The ingredients needed are citrus fruit (can be lemon or grapefruit) or yuja, honey, and sugar. The first step is thoroughly clean the fruits. Next, cut the yuja into thin slices and remove the seeds. Put the yuja slices into a bowl, and mix in the honey and sugar. Lastly, put the mixture in a container and store it in a cool, dark area until the syrup is created (about six months). When ready, stir in 1-2 tablespoon of Yuja tea into hot water. The syrup of the yuja tea is also used in cocktails, spread for toast, or ice cream.

Gallery

See also 
 Traditional Korean tea

References

External links 

 Yujacha recipe from Korea National Tourism Organization, published by Asia Society

Condiments
Herbal tea
Korean tea
Traditional medicine
Citrus drinks